Paul Hoggart is a British journalist and novelist.

Early life and career
Hoggart spent some years as a further education lecturer at Kingsway College and then Woolwich College in London before moving into journalism as a book reviewer, feature writer, television critic, columnist and interviewer particularly for The Times. He has also written for The Guardian, Observer, The Independent, Daily Telegraph, Radio Times, Broadcast, The Stage, Saga and Young Performer magazines, and the screenwriters’ website twelvepoint.com.

His first novel, A Man Against a Background of Flames,  was published on Kindle by Pighog Press in April 2013. The print edition was published in October 2013.

Personal life
He is the younger son of Richard Hoggart and brother of the political journalist Simon Hoggart. His sister Nicola is a teacher. He married his wife Elizabeth in Las Vegas, Nevada in 2001, although they had been together for twenty-five years prior to that. They live in north London and have three children: Matthew, Edward and Rose.

References

20th-century British journalists
20th-century English male writers
21st-century British writers
21st-century English male writers
English columnists
English male journalists
English male non-fiction writers
English television critics
Paul
Living people
The Times people
Year of birth missing (living people)